Sun Jiajun (born 29 July 1996) is a Chinese professional racing cyclist. She rode in the women's road race at the 2016 UCI Road World Championships, but she did not finish the race.

References

External links
 

1996 births
Living people
Chinese female cyclists
Cyclists from Liaoning
Cyclists at the 2018 Asian Games
Asian Games competitors for China
Olympic cyclists of China
Cyclists at the 2020 Summer Olympics
21st-century Chinese women